Theresa Ulmer (born February 26, 1962) was a member of the Arizona House of Representatives for a single term. She represented the 24th District during the 48th Legislature, winning the November 2006 election. She lost to Russell Jones during the general election during her unsuccessful re-election bid in 2008.

References

Democratic Party members of the Arizona House of Representatives
1962 births
Living people
21st-century American politicians
21st-century American women politicians